Vladimir Agapov is the name of:
 Vladimir Agapov (born 1933), Soviet football player and coach
 Vladimir Agapov (born 1982), Russian football player